is a Japanese baseball sports simulation game series, developed by Power Pros Production and published by Konami. It is a spin-off series of the Jikkyō Powerful Pro Yakyū (Power Pros) franchise.

Games

Pro Yakyū Spirits 2004 

Professional Yakyuu Spirits 2004 (プロ野球スピリッツ2004, Pro Yakyū Spirits 2004) is a baseball simulation video game developed by Konami for the PlayStation 2 that was released on March 25, 2004.

Pro Yakyū Spirits 2 

Professional Yakyuu Spirits 2 (プロ野球スピリッツ2, Pro Yakyū Spirits 2) is a baseball simulation video game developed by Konami for the PlayStation 2 that was released on April 7, 2005.

Pro Yakyū Spirits 3 

Professional Yakyuu Spirits 3 (プロ野球スピリッツ3, Pro Yakyū Spirits 3) is a baseball simulation game designed for the Xbox 360 and PlayStation 2 systems. The game was released on April 6, 2006 and is developed and published by Konami.

Pro Yakyū Spirits 4 

Professional Baseball Spirits 4 (プロ野球スピリッツ4, Pro Yakyū Spirits 4) is a baseball video game published by Konami for the PlayStation 2 and PlayStation 3 in Japan on May 1, 2007. It is the sequel of Pro Yakyū Spirits 3.

Gameplay overview 
The game features all 12 Nippon Professional Baseball teams, and both the Pacific League and Central League All-Star teams (circa 2006, but with changes made for traded and/or retired players).

The difficulty level for the game is adjustable.  The easiest mode will appeal to younger players who have probably never played a baseball game before in their lives, and the hardest mode—known as Spirits Mode—will give even the most experienced and advanced players a challenge with superior AI.  Other modes can be selected in a sort of pseudo-gameplay sliders mode.  For instance, gameplay speed can be increased, as well as pitch speed (which can be set to "real" speed).

The basic batting interface is a silhouette of a bat which influences how the ball will travel.  Depending on when and where contact was made, that influences where the ball goes.  The pitching is a 2-click system where the player selects his pitch around a grid, presses X to start his delivery, then pressing X as one circle converges on another to try and perfectly time the pitch.

Reception 
Around the time of its release, it was the only PlayStation 3 video game that was among the top 50 best-selling video games in Japan.

Pro Yakyū Spirits 5 

Professional Baseball Spirits 5 (プロ野球スピリッツ5, Pro Yakyū Spirits 5) is a baseball video game published by Konami for the PlayStation 2 and PlayStation 3 in Japan on May 1, 2008. It is the sequel to Professional Baseball Spirits 4.

Improvements and Additions 
On the PlayStation 3 version of Pro Yakyū Spirits 5, the game saw many small improvements.  The graphics were enhanced further from the previous incarnation, but the major fixes were in the gameplay.  First of all, the load times that plagued the previous game were fixed, meaning less of the "black screens" that ere used for short load times in PYS4.  The game also has more of a television-style presentation, new animations for slap hits, and a new meter that tells players what pitch the CPU batter is expecting.

The new mode in PYS5 which replaces the MVP Mode in the previous game is Stardom Mode.  It plays like a full-fledged Career Mode, where a player can either take control of an existing player or create their own player to go through a maximum of 20 years of play.  Experience points are distributed on how well the player does in his at-bat.

Pro Yakyū Spirits 5 Kanzenban 
On December 4, 2008, Konami released a new, updated version of Pro Yakyū Spirits 5, with the subtitle "Kanzenban," which means "Perfect Version."  Priced at 8000 yen (US$88) and released on both the PlayStation 2 and PlayStation 3, Kanzenban touted many improvements over the original as a post-season version of the game.  For instance, every player who appeared in a game in the 2008 NPB season for all 12 teams was included on each team's roster, there were new player animations, enhanced artificial intelligence, and also small improvements to graphics (foreign players, for example, no longer look generic and have their actual swings), online play, baserunning, and fielding.

Kanzenban marked the first time since Pro Yakyu Spirits 2004 Climax that a PYS game had been re-made for a post-season version, similar to that of the "Ketteiban" games in Pro Yakyu Spirits' sister series, Jikkyou Powerful Pro Yakyuu.

Pro Yakyū Spirits 6 

Professional Yakyuu Spirits 6 (プロ野球スピリッツ6, Pro Yakyū Spirits 6) is a baseball simulation video game developed by Konami and PawaPuro Productions for the PlayStation 2 and PlayStation 3 that was released on July 16, 2009.

New Features 
The new major mode in the game for this season is the World Baseball Classic mode.  Upon booting the game, the first menu is to decide whether the player wants to play the WBC mode or the regular Pro Yakyuu Spirits game.  The rosters are accurate for all WBC teams, and it is possible to play an entire tournament as any of the 16 teams.

Pro Yakyū Spirits 2010 

Professional Yakyuu Spirits 2010 (プロ野球スピリッツ2010, Pro Yakyū Spirits 2010) is a baseball simulation video game developed by Konami and PawaPuro Productions for the PlayStation 2, PlayStation 3 and PlayStation Portable that was released on April 1, 2010.

Pro Yakyū Spirits 2011 

Professional Yakyuu Spirits 2011 (プロ野球スピリッツ2011, Pro Yakyū Spirits 2011) is a baseball simulation video game developed by Konami and PawaPuro Productions for the PlayStation 3, PlayStation Portable and Nintendo 3DS that was released on April 14, 2011.

Pro Yakyū Spirits 2012 

Pro Yakyuu Spirits 2012(プロ野球スピリッツ2012, Pro Yakyū Spirits 2012) is a baseball simulation video game developed by Konami Digital Entertainment and PawaPuro Productions for the PlayStation Portable, PlayStation Vita and PlayStation 3 that was released on March 29, 2012.

Resume 
The previous version was released on the 3DS, but publishers have decided to give preference to PlayStation Vita.

The announced release date, is the same for all announced platforms, and is timed to the launch of a new baseball season.

New features and updates 
 Has been completely redesigned graphics, back view of many of those before the operation. In addition, the display changes were made to account for the display and the player's name, which contains.
 Roster can be online updated in the PlayStation Vita version.
 Added new commentator - Tsutomu Ito

Pro Yakyū Spirits 2013 

Professional Yakyuu Spirits 2013 (プロ野球スピリッツ2013, Pro Yakyū Spirits 2013) is a baseball simulation video game developed by Konami and PawaPuro Productions for the PlayStation 3, PlayStation Portable and PlayStation Vita that was released on March 20, 2013.

Pro Yakyū Spirits 2014 

Professional Yakyuu Spirits 2014 (プロ野球スピリッツ2014, Pro Yakyū Spirits 2014) is a baseball simulation video game developed by Konami and PawaPuro Productions for the PlayStation 3, PlayStation Portable and PlayStation Vita that was released on March 20, 2014.

Pro Yakyū Spirits 2015 

Professional Yakyuu Spirits 2015 (プロ野球スピリッツ2015, Pro Yakyū Spirits 2015) is a baseball simulation video game developed by Konami and PawaPuro Productions for the PlayStation 3 and PlayStation Vita that was released on March 26, 2015.

Pro Yakyū Spirits A 

Professional Yakyuu Spirits A (プロ野球スピリッツA, Pro Yakyū Spirits Ace) is a mobile baseball video game developed by Konami and PawaPuro Productions for iOS and Android that was released on October 21, 2015.  the game has received  downloads.

Pro Yakyū Spirits 2019 

Professional Yakyuu Spirits 2019 (プロ野球スピリッツ2019, Pro Yakyū Spirits 2019) is a baseball simulation video game developed by Konami and PawaPuro Productions for the PlayStation 4 and PlayStation Vita that was released on July 18, 2019.

See also 
Kōshien (series)

References

External links 
 

Japan-exclusive video games
Konami games
Nippon Professional Baseball video games
Xbox 360 games
PlayStation 2 games
PlayStation 3 games
Video game franchises introduced in 2004
Video games set in Japan
Video games developed in Japan